BBC Alba has the rights to various sporting events, which it covers in the medium of Scottish Gaelic and under the umbrella of its Spòrs sports television programme.
The programme is entirely in Scottish Gaelic apart from some interviews which are conducted in English. The programme is usually shown on Saturday evenings, although for live coverage of events this will tend to be at other times.

Coverage

Football
Coverage of football extends across various divisions and cups. BBC Alba's coverage of the SPL includes one full delayed SPL match that is not already being covered live by another channel. In addition, BBC Alba will soon be broadcasting selected games from the Scottish First Division.

BBC Alba also shows live coverage of the Scottish Challenge Cup, which is currently sponsored by one of its operators MG Alba.

Rugby Union
Currently, BBC Alba broadcasts highlights and selected live matches from the Scottish Premiership Division One rugby union league.

Shinty
BBC Alba covers various events from the game of shinty, including the Camanachd Cup.

Presenters
Evelyn Coull is the main presenter of all Spòrs' programmes. Co-presenters are Martin MacDonald and Ruaraidh Munro. Match commentators include Derek MacKay, Ailig O'Henley and Hugh Dan MacLennan.

Guests
People who have appeared on the programme include:

Alex Salmond
Brian Laudrup
Kenny Dalglish
Jackie McNamara
Murdo MacLeod
Tommy Docherty

External links
Spòrs at BBC Alba

BBC Alba shows
BBC Sport
Sports television in Scotland
Football mass media in Scotland
Scottish Premiership on television
2010s Scottish television series
2020s Scottish television series
BBC Scotland television shows
2010s British sports television series
2020s British sports television series